Town Hall Arts Center, formerly the Littleton Town Hall, is located in downtown Littleton, Colorado and has been a local professional theatre, producing comedies, musicals and plays to the Denver metropolitan area for over 30 years. The building was designated a National Register of Historic Places on September 4, 1980.

Littleton Town Hall (1920–1977)
Designed by Colorado architect Jacques Benedict and built in 1920 as a new center for civic activities, the Italianate building contained the treasurer's office, council chambers, fire truck and hose rooms, and a large second-floor auditorium. The design was inspired by the Palazzo della Ragione in Vicenza, northern Italy, yet it has American elements like  an eagle in the lunettes over the second story windows and the Colorado state flower, the Columbine on the facade. 

The floor plan was modified beginning in the 1950s to add offices. The Town Hall was one of the first buildings designated under the historic preservation ordinance in 1972. A new office building was occupied by the City of Littleton in 1977. Through fundraising and other efforts, it opened as a performing arts center and art gallery in 1983.

Town Hall Arts Center (since 1983)
Town Hall Arts Center is now a live theater, cultural center, and art gallery, offering six main stage musicals or comedies and seven to eight concerts during the September through June production season. The theater program for children produces two shows annually with professional actors. Classes are held throughout the year for students aged  seven to seventeen in stage craft, acting, and creative dramatics.

References

Further reading
  - Information about how the Town Hall Arts Center programs were developed

External links

Official Town Hall Arts Center Website
History and photographs of the old Town Hall at Historic American Buildings Survey

Italianate architecture in Colorado
Government buildings completed in 1920
Theatres in Colorado
City and town halls on the National Register of Historic Places in Colorado
Littleton, Colorado
Buildings and structures in Arapahoe County, Colorado
Tourist attractions in Arapahoe County, Colorado
National Register of Historic Places in Arapahoe County, Colorado